Graeme Ronald Vimpani (born 27 January 1972 in Brisbane, Queensland) was an Australian first-class cricketer who played for the Victorian Bushrangers as a right-handed top order batsman.

Vimpani made his debut in 1995–96, opening the batting alongside Matthew Elliott. In his 30 first class appearances he made 3 hundreds with a highest score of 161 against NSW at the MCG. Other notable performances include his maiden first class century of 133 against the West Indies in 1996/97.

Vimpani also played 19 one day matches for Victoria with a top score of 93 against NSW.

Following his playing career, he worked at Cricket Australia in Public Affairs for several years, before joining the private sector.

See also
 List of Victoria first-class cricketers

External links
 

1972 births
Living people
Victoria cricketers
Australian cricketers